Paz de Ariporo Airport  is an airport serving the town of Paz de Ariporo in the Casanare Department of Colombia. The runway is adjacent to the eastern edge of the town.

See also

Transport in Colombia
List of airports in Colombia

References

External links
OpenStreetMap - Paz de Ariporo
OurAirports - Paz de Ariporo
SkyVector - Paz de Ariporo
Paz de Ariporo Airport

Airports in Colombia